MR/ Ehalape Vidyaraja Maha Vidyala (Sinhala:ඇහැලපේ විද්‍යාරාජ මහා විද්‍යාලය) is a government school for boys and girls in Akuressa, Matara, Sri Lanka which is located in the Dediyagala Road Ehalape Village. The school is situated in an attractive area, beautiful paddy field. The school was initially founded as a Buddhist school in 1924. The school presently consists of over 1000 student population with children studying from primary level to secondary level education with a faculty of 30 teachers.

References

1924 establishments in Ceylon
Educational institutions established in 1924
Provincial schools in Sri Lanka